Champville SC is a Lebanese basketball team from Dik El Mehdi, Lebanon, which competes in the Lebanese Basketball League.

History
In Game 4 of the 2011–2012 Finals, Champville defeated Anibal Zahle 63–57. As a result, Champville won the series 3–1. The finals did not end without problems though, just like the semi-finals, as “A large part of the Annibal audience was absent from the game in Zahle after online appeals were posted on the Lebanese Forces website calling on March 14 supporters to boycott the game and to follow it from the Martyrs Square in Zahle"

Squad

 

Depth Chart

Honours 
Lebanese Basketball League
Champions (1): 2011–12
Runners-up (5): 2000–01, 2001–02, 2009–10, 2010–11, 2020–21

Lebanese Cup
Winners (2): 2004, 2010

 Lebanese SuperCup
Winners (1): 2011

West Asian Basketball League
Winners (1): 2013

Dubai International Basketball Tournament
Winners (1): 2004

Arab/Asian cups 
2010–2011 WABA: took 2nd place (3–1) in Group B; Arab Club Championships: Took 1st place (5–0) in Group B, beat Al Riyadi (73–69) in the quarter-finals, lost to Sharjah (75–80) in the semi-finals.

2011–2012 WABA: took 2nd place (3–1) in Group B, lost to Al Riyadi (Lebanon) 1–2 in the semi-finals.

References

External links 
Champville at asia-basket.com

Basketball teams in Lebanon
Basketball teams established in 1967
1967 establishments in Lebanon